Paul I of Russia was the Emperor of all Russia (or Tsar) between 1796 and 1801, when he was deposed and assassinated in a palace coup. Paul succeeded his mother, Catherine the Great, and almost immediately launched a campaign to revoke her legacy. Paul appears to have hated his mother and her acts as Empress. Paul revoked many of her decrees on the day of his accession, denigrated her memory and promoted that of his father, Peter. Catherine had generally worked with the Russian nobility and treated them sympathetically. Paul, however, revoked many of their privileges, believing them to be weak, disorganized, and needing strict treatment.

Paul, influenced by the French Revolution seven years earlier, also attacked the prevalence of French culture in Russia in an effort to prevent the influence of revolutionary ideals. Foreign travel was banned, and visitors could only travel from France on a passport issued by the House of Bourbon. Censorship increased, and fashion especially was forcibly changed; anything deemed to be French, such as round hats and high cravats—or particularly non-Russian, such as a certain style of coach harness, were prohibited. Secret police vigorously enforced Paul's edicts. 

Paul also made sweeping reforms to the Russian Imperial Army. Already a martinet—he drilled his household troops continuously as Grand Duke—he instituted a brutal military regime. Units were drilled constantly; officers, whom the ranks were encouraged to anonymously denounce, were liable to summary punishment for the slightest infractions. Paul occasionally beat them himself, or they could be dismissed from the rank and exiled to Siberia.

The army's uniforms were redesigned in the Prussian fashion, which was deeply disliked as the tight uniforms were felt to be impractical. There was also an emphasis on minutiae, such as waxed hair.

Paul's sweeping changes alienated so many areas of society that he was eventually deposed in a coup and assassinated. Contemporaries, including his doctors, commented that he seemed in a perpetual state of stress and liable to incandescent rages. While 19th- and early-20th-century historians generally accepted these assertions, more recent historiography has tended to emphasize the difficulties of medical diagnosis 200 years later, and note that the contemporary memoirs those earlier historians cited were not impartial sources. The debate was likely restricted until at least the 20th century, as questioning the cause of Paul's disposition might have given rise to questions as to the legitimacy of the later Romanovs. Others have noted that contemporary diplomatic letters are more reliable as sources.

There is a broad consensus that Paul probably was mentally unstable or had a spectrum disorder, but how much this affected his reign or his ability is questionable. His ability to operate as expected was less affected than traditionally asserted. Modern historians emphasize the positive policies Paul enacted, which, while not precluding mental illness, left a legacy despite it.

Background 

Born in 1754, Paul was the son of Emperor Peter III and Catherine the Great. Six months after Peter's accession, Catherine took part in a  against Peter in which he was deposed and subsequently killed in prison. During Catherine's reign, Russia was revitalised. It expanded both territorially and economically, greatly increased contacts with Western Europe, and was eventually recognized as a great power. The Russian Empire expanded rapidly by conquest and diplomacy. The Ottoman Empire was defeated in the Russo-Turkish wars, and Novorossiya on the Black and Azov Seas were colonized. In the west, the Polish–Lithuanian Commonwealth was partitioned, and the Russian Empire took the largest portion.

Catherine reformed the administration of Russian guberniyas (governorates). An admirer of Peter the Great, Catherine continued to modernize Russia along Western European lines. However, military conscription and the economy continued to depend on serfdom, and the increasing demands of the state and private landowners intensified the exploitation of serf labour. This led to a number of peasant rebellions throughout her reign, including the large-scale Pugachev Rebellion.

Catherine, the Great's reign is considered the Golden Age of Russia. The Manifesto on Freedom of the Nobility, issued during the short reign of Peter III and confirmed by Catherine, freed Russian nobles from compulsory military or state service. She enthusiastically supported the ideals of the Enlightenment and is often included in the ranks of enlightened despots. Towards the end of her reign, in 1789, revolution broke out in France. This resulted in the execution of Louis XVI and sent shock waves through other European powers. As a result, Catherine rejected many principles of the Enlightenment she had previously favoured.

Upbringing and as Crown Prince 
Paul's upbringing was a tension between different ideas and aspirations for his future rule. On the one hand, he was expected to be an enlightened constitutionalist; conversely, he was also encouraged to live up to the aggressive martial reputation of his predecessor, Peter the Great. Paul had begun demonstrating eccentric behaviour before his accession, usually in outbursts of incandescent rage, for example, dismissing an entire platoon because it lost an order, or threatening to beat his gardener with a stick. He reached his legal majority in 1772 but had not received any official offices or positions as a result.

Foreign diplomats reported to their masters on Paul's behaviour. Whitworth wrote about Paul's "acrimony of disposition", while the Austrian ambassador, Louis Cobenzl, observed that "one absolutely does not know what to count on with the Grand Duke, he changes his language and his sentiments almost every moment". The French emissary believed that Paul could have been deranged, and the French charge d'affaires, Sabatier de Cabre, reported that the then 14 year old PaulMcGrew argues that Paul's reputation for disturbing behaviour was established in St Petersburg by 1794 following several incidents at court relating to Paul's pursuit of a lady, Yekaterina Nelidova. This affair was the immediate cause of Catherine's intention to change her heir apparent. 

The Austrian ambassador, Cobenzl, had worked with Paul on occasion, and was aware of his propensity for fits of anger. Cobenzl was apprehensive as to the future, and wrote home that he had not seen any sign so far that the prince possessed the necessary leadership qualities and could only hope that he would learn them soon. This though, comments McGrew, "was a very slender hope. Paul was 42 years old, his personality was firmly set and he had long since decided who his enemies were." 

The roots of Paul's distrustful nature may be found in his lonely upbringing. Catherine had acceded the Imperial throne following the deposition and murder of her husband, Emperor Peter III, who was officially Paul's father. Catherine kept Paul sequestered at Gatchina, a rural estate far from St Petersburg and power, and it seems likely that Catherine had intended to supplant Paul as her heir with his son, Alexander, although she died before this could be legislated for. Here, increasingly isolated, Paul spent most of his time organizing his personal regiment, parading and punishing them to the point of tyranny.

Relationship with his mother 
Paul's hatred for Catherine may have stemmed from his belief that she had been complicit in the overthrow (and assassination) of his father, Peter III. Also, the revolutionaries of 1762 had originally proposed Paul as the new emperor, with Catherine acting only as regent; this did not suit Catherine's plans and explains her subsequent near-exile of him to Gatchina. He and Catherine were opposites; the scholar Jerome Blum believes Paul had a "pathological hatred" of Catherine, who had, for her part, "treated him shamefully". Paul bore an "intense hatred" for his mother, says Dmytryshyn.

Political ideology 
Paul wanted to reaffirm absolute sovereignty in the face of the French Revolution, and defend traditional royal power. His political vision—a combination of paternalism and absolutism within the law— was in his mother's tradition, and was a common feature of late-18th-century monarchs. Paul's policies were founded on two overriding factors: a determination to reverse, mitigate or produce a "heroic repudiation" of the policies of his mother, out of hatred for her, and rejection of the influence of the French revolution, out of fear of it.

Paul's theoretical ideology, enlightened absolutism, was, says McGrew, in the Russian context, distinctly progressive. Louis XIV, the Maximilien de Béthune, Duke of Sully, Peter the Great and Frederick II were his personal influences. Unfortunately, continues McGrew, "the gap between these generalized intentions and what Paul did is enormous". His breadth of political vision was constrained by his concern for the minute. Anything indicative of equality or democracy was his target. Vasily Klyuchevsky considers Paul's policies to have been based on the guiding principles of order, discipline and equality, while Michael W. Curran and David Mackenzie base their rule on "enlightened absolutism".

Autocracy 
Paul's demand for continual service from his nobility eventually cost him his life. Paul, says Wortman, "humiliated the nobility, turning them from comrades in arms into victims". For instance, Catherine gave him a captured Turkish prisoner, Ivan Pavlovich Kutaysov. Paul promptly made him a Russian count with a large estate, purely to spite the nobility, suggests Lieven. Loewenson argued that Paul's growing autocracy was in direct contrast with his upbringing as a constitutionalist: The Russian aristocracy was, by now, almost completely westernized, and French had become their first language. Paul seems to have equated aristocratic luxury with wastefulness, and believed that years of indulgent rule by a permissive female ruler had led to men—predominantly of the nobility—becoming soft and socially irresponsible, hence his edicts primarily focusing on perceived social ills of that class. Paul wanted to instill the nobility with a new-found moral discipline.

J. M. K. Vivyan, writing in the New Cambridge Modern History, argues that enmity towards the nobility was inherent to Russia's Tsars, due to their vulnerability to palace coups, but in Paul's case, it was exacerbated by his treatment by his mother, who had supported the aristocracy. Paul distrusted his aristocracy, particularly those who dwelt on their estates rather than attending court.

Catherine had generally favoured the nobility, but Paul, in the interests of overturning her policies, did the opposite, greatly constraining the aristocracies' liberties. He said, on one occasion, that to him, "only he is great in Russia to whom I am speaking, and only as long as I speak [to him]", regardless of birth or status, in what Montefiori has called a comment "worthy of Caligula". Lieven suggests that Paul's idealized Emperor-vassal relationship "did not represent late 18th-century Russian realities", especially his echoing of Caligula's dictum, "let them hate so long as they fear". Wishing to roll back the political power of the aristocratic class, Paul did so both in the big picture and in the detail, for example annulling the nobility's exemption from corporal punishment. Lieven argues that Paul's attack on the aristocracy's liberties was limited, although still sufficient to persuade them to conspire against him later on. However, there appears to have been little or no resistance to him, reflecting that people saw no choice other than to accept what the Emperor chose to do. Whitworth, for example, commented that, although in other countries Paul's intemperate decrees might have been resisted, in Russia because of "the character of the people, and that spirit of subordination which yet prevails, scarcely a murmur is heard". It was ironic, comments McGrew, that the only class to forcibly resist Paul in arms was the class he had tried to protect, the serfs: around 55 separate peasant uprisings were recorded between the death of Catherine in November and the New Year. This was followed by nearly 120 in the first three months of 1797.

Anti-French Revolution 
Everything that hinted at revolution was banned, which he feared deeply. Paul's hatred of revolutions was based on his view of his subjects: they were his children and were easily distracted, and needed firm guidance.

Paul's actions against Jacobinism occasionally appeared comedic. Having a deep-seated fear of Jacobins, he believed himself to be surrounded by them, even on his estate. A contemporary tells how Paul kept his estate in a permanent state of siege, writing that "every day, one hears of nothing but acts of violence. The Grand Duke thinks every moment that someone is wanting in respect or has the intention of criticizing his actions. He sees everywhere manifestations of the revolution."

Reversal of Catherine's policies 
His campaign against his mother began immediately; he refused to wear the Imperial crown at his coronation because she had worn it first. There was also a tradition of new monarchs making bold breaks with their predecessors' policies, which he saw as righting Catherine's wrongs, suggests McGrew. Paul did not just attack her policies, but physical reminders of her reign: Tsarskoe Selo Palace was allowed to fall into disrepair, having been one of her favoured residences. He sought to subvert her legacy.

While Paul's reign had similarities with that of his predecessor, the difference, says Ryeff, was personality: unlike Catherine, Paul "was capricious and unstable; his rule degenerated into one of abusive treatment". 

Before Catherine died, French influence on Russia was already being curtailed; freedom of movement between the countries was restricted and diplomatic relations hardened, although culturally French culture remained predominant. Catherine had also placed all French citizens residing in St Petersburg under surveillance.

Under Catherine, says Grey, the nobility gained all they had sought; it was their "golden age". Paul had a dislike of what he saw as being the "immorality" of Catherine's reign, The nobles to whom she had made grants had them immediately reversed and withdrawn, and changes of staff, removing Catherine's appointments "proceeded at a dizzying pace". Undoing his mother's policies were the one place where Paul showed consistency: "with one stroke of the pen he abrogated a whole series of Catherine's decrees. Regardless, notes Kluchevsky, of whether they were good or bad, and even on occasion neutralizing his progressive decrees in the course of overturning his predecessor's.

Paul was seen as authoritarian, and "fostered centralized". Historian Hugh Ragsdale has said that whereas Catherine was a "masterful opportunist[...] Paul was her polar opposite". Catherine had also maintained a policy of Russification, particularly in the Baltic states and Poland. As a result, Paul's policy was to restore to these areas their local rights and devolve the interests of the Russian government in them. Cross notes that "Paul was prepared to do many things to spite the memory of his mother-but the restoration of any degree of freedom to publish was not one of them".

Although Catherine had been known, occasionally, as "the Great" during her lifetime, during the reign of Paul it achieved broad acceptance, notes Alexander, "perhaps partly in silent protest of Paul's ill-considered efforts to demean his mother".

Pro-Prussia 
Paul admired all things Prussian. Such a philosophy was not confined to Paul, as what Wortman calls "Prussomania" had engulfed Europe in the 18th century, although it made the greatest impact in Russia. Whitworth, reporting on Paul's first day as Emperor, amid the installation of his Prussian-themed army, wrote how "the Court and the town are  entirely military, and we can scare persuade ourselves that instead of Petersburg we are not in Potsdam". While Admiral Shishkov commented that "the change was so great, that it looked like nothing other than an enemy invasion[...] there were armed soldiers everywhere". Thus, says Wortman, although Paul's accession was not by way of a military coup, it had the appearance of one as a result of his march on St Petersburg with the Gatchina units. Sablukov echoed these complaints, saying that whereas St Petersburg had been one of the most modern European capitals under Catherine, under her son it had become "more like a German one, two centuries back".

Accession 
Russian historian Basil Dmytryshyn has described the Russia that Paul inherited:

One of only four men to sit on the throne in 75 years, all of whom, suggests J. T. Alexander, "reigned briefly and ingloriously if at all". In the days before his coronation in Moscow, he was cheered whenever he entered the city; the gentry particularly looked forward to his reign. Likewise, common people crowded around him in the streets when he let them, which was often; according to McGrew "he never showed the fear of ordinary people[...] and he unhesitatingly went among them, even at great personal danger to himself, to hear their complaints". This was, comments McGrew, a "striking characteristic" of his rule. The early days of the reign characterized the remainder, with, says McGrew, "no relaxation from first to last". An anonymous report to Lord Grenville from Vienna early in the reign advised the Foreign Secretary that "I do not believe you will have any assistance from the Emperor... and above all because, in his quality of successor to the throne, he is naturally disposed to adopt measures different from those of his predecessor".

The first sign that Paul intended to follow his father's legacy rather than his mother's came shortly after her burial. Having prayed at her corpse four nights after her death, he then led his family to a chapel to hear a requiem for Peter III. On the day of his coronation, 5 April 1797 probably as a reaction to his earlier fears that he would be supplanted as Catherine's heir by his son, one of his first major acts was to regulate the Imperial succession, installing a system of primogeniture. He reinterred his father into an imperial sarcophagus next to Catherine, whom he assumed had been complicit in his overthrow and murder. The coffin was opened and the royal family kissed what remained of Peter's hand. Comments Michael Farquhar, "thus, after thirty-four years, the husband and wife who loathed each other in life were reunited in death". This "macabre ceremony" was followed by a posthumous coronation for Peter.

The reign started auspiciously, with the pardoning of around 12,000 political prisoners. The first few months of the reign, suggests McGrew, received "mixed reviews" from contemporaries. On the one hand, they accepted that, while inexperienced, he wanted what was best and that he was right in wanting to halt abuses. On the other hand, he was criticized for the lack of consistency in his approach, as well as his insensate rages and spontaneous punishments that often resulted.

The practice of reporting one's social superiors to Paul by way of a private petition was encouraged: Paul had a yellow box installed outside the Winter Palace—the sole key to which he possessed—from which he collected deposited petitions. Eventually, though, satires and caricatures began also being left in the box, at which point Paul had it removed. Peasants, while also allowed to petition, were forbidden to do so collectively, only being able to do so as individuals.

Edicts 

Paul disapproved of almost all aspects of Saint Petersberg society, and what he found offensive he intended to correct. The reign began "almost immediately [by] alienating the major power groups" of Russian society. He alienated liberals by censoring their literature, the military by the imposition of a Prussian military culture, merchants and the mercantile classes by disrupting trade through his foreign policy, and the nobility by publicly humiliating them when he chose. This explains Paul's appointment of General Nikolai Arkharov to the civil position of governor-general of the city: Arkharov willingly implemented Gatchina-style rules. Arkharov was particularly responsible for the severe enforcement of Imperial edicts, says McGrew, commenting how his police "won fame of a sort for their unrestrained, often violent, and usually mindless handling of violators". As the Governor of Saint Petersburg, Arkharov became known as the "minister of terror", for the zeal he demonstrated in enforcing Paul's edicts.

Saint Petersburg, says McGrew, became a social minefield. The tension was increased by the speed with which new regulations were being issued, and many would not leave the house in case they broke a new rule that they had not yet heard of. Thousands were arrested, and, argue MacKenzie and Curran, "the populace from top to bottom lived in increasing fear of an arbitrary, capricious emperor[...] a police straitjacket tightened upon Russian society, arbitrary arrests multiplied, and insecurity rose among the elite". Not just arrests but corporal punishment was common. An army captain was sentenced to 100 strokes of the cane, on another occasion a priest received the knout for owning banned books and an officer had his tongue cut out.

Paul's views were ideological; much was changing across Europe, especially culturally, but Paul viewed this as a sign of social disorder and weakness. The decrees were criticized internationally; for example in Scotland, The Scots Magazine declared that Paul, "probably with a view to preventing the progress of Liberty, the Emperor has attempted to check the expansion of intellect and to destroy the source of knowledge through the Empire". The authors of The Cambridge Modern History argue that on his accession, "Russia in general speedily realized the worst that had been prophesied of Paul". To this end, he issued over 2000 ukases in the course of his five-year reign, and 48,000 general orders in 1797 alone. Paul's decrees affected the Empire as a whole; Whitworth wrote, "the ardour for reform, or more properly for a change, extends even to the Provinces, where everything as in the Capital must now wear a military appearance". The effect of Paul's reforms, says Dmytryshyn, was to sow "confusion, uncertainty and irritation".

Military 
Paul was obsessed with the paraphernalia of war. Army officers were forbidden to eat lunch wearing their hats.

When Field Marshal Alexander Suvorov objected to Paul's treatment of the army he was banished to his estates. Paul's treatment of the army was crucial to his later overthrow. Apart from forcing Prussian-style uniforms upon them, he exercised a rule of iron over its men.

On the other hand, while observing a parade one morning with Count Repnin, Paul remarked "Marshal, you see this guard of 400 men? At one word, I could promote every one of them to marshal". Paul applied the principles he had enforced at Gatchina to Saint Petersburg society. In effect, society was to be drilled the same way the military was. The problem with this, notes McGrew, was that while the military rule book laid down parameters and boundaries of conduct, the civilian regulations did not:

The army was reorganized on Prussian lines, with Prussian uniforms and "draconian" discipline with it. The uniforms were tight enough to prevent men from sitting, and also to prevent them from standing up on their own if they fell over; an English observer compared them to the "stiff, wooden machines" of the Seven Years' War. Hair was plaited and set in a "noisesome" paste of wax, lard, and flour, which over time started smelling bad. Paul, says Simon Sebag Montefiore, "regarded the waxed Prussian plaits as the expression of the ancien régime against the tousled locks of French freedom". Paul also introduced other unsuitable items, such as buckled shoes. As a result, noted Cobenzl, over half the officers of the Imperial Guard resigned their commissions. These edicts, suggests Esdaile, were the product of Paul's belief that "relaxation in the norms expected of a gentleman would undermine respect for their betters among the populace", and that therefore they needed regulating.

Sealed coaches were maintained during every parade to whisk away those that incurred Paul's displeasure. This was documented by the General, Alexander Sablukov, who reported that not only had he done this himself but on three occasions had had to lend money to comrades who had failed to take such a precaution: "When we mounted guard, we used to put a few hundred roubles in banknotes into our coat pockets so as not to be left penniless if suddenly sent away", he wrote. Paul occasionally beat men on parade himself; an entire troop could be transferred to the provinces in an instant, cashiered, or its officers reduced in rank to foot soldiers. Paul took pleasure in his role as a drill sergeant, even more in finding this wrong. A martinet, brutal punishments—such as flogging with the knout—were inflicted on the culprits. Conversely, a soldier on review might find himself promoted on the spot. According to Sablukov, under Paul, royal military service was "very unpleasant".

Civilian 

Paul's domestic policy was unpopular, particularly among the Russian nobility, who were especially affected. Changes in dress had begun on Catherine's death. Paul's edits were introduced with immediate effect: "new uniforms were fitted, sewn, and worn in a matter of hours; frock-coats disappeared or were turned into emergency cloaks by slashing scissors, while even round hats could be folded and pinned to form a tricorn". Of ladies haircuts, the latest fashion in France was that à la guillotine; like other Parisian-tailored clothes and fashion, it was to be expunged. Paul's offensive was against "the whole of contemporary male chic", says McGrew.

"Attacks with shears on people's clothing in the streets recalled Peter I's assaults on traditional caftans and beards, but now anything reminiscent of French as opposed to Russian dress, including associated vocabulary (gilet, pantalon), was suspect. Paul banned certain books, music and foreign travel, much as Catherine had done after 1793 in her understandable response to the French Terror, but the need for such sanctions now seemed unconvincing, as did the introduction of a host of niceties Of etiquette that victimized nobles who under Catherine were beginning to enjoy some degree of security. Demands such as the one that ladies curtsy to the emperor in the street and thus drag their clothes in the mud seemed demeaning. For men, the wrong belt buckle or a step out of place would result in a humiliating beating or banishment." Paul brandished his horsewhip at pedestrians in the street.

Prostration 
One of the most unpopular instructions was promulgated in late 1800, and dealt with how to behave on meeting the Emperor's carriage in the street. Regardless of age, gender or class, and regardless of the mode of transport—on foot, horseback or carriage—had to dismount immediately. The police were especially concerned to implement this decree. Men had to bow deeply if Paul passed them in the street, and to remain on their knee until he had passed, and their ladies had to prostrate themselves, irrespective of the condition of the roads they had to kneel on. This may have been a means of demonstrating his power. People went to the trouble of finding out where Paul or his family were likely to be travelling and then avoided these streets where possible to avoid public prostration all of which was enshrined in law. On one occasion Paul reprimanded a nanny out pushing a baby's pushchair for not doffing the baby's sunbonnet at the Emperor: Paul removed it himself. "Wallowing in the pomp and circumstance of power", argue MacKenzie and Curran, Paul demanded his nobility prostrate themselves before him. Those seen wearing the forbidden round hats were pursued by the police and if caught by the adjutants were liable to face being bastinadoed. There were 300 police detailed to uphold the Emperor's social decrees. Clothes would be shredded in front of their owners and shoes confiscated in the street.

Those wishing to hold balls, parties or other social gatherings—including weddings and funerals—had to follow detailed legislation, including receiving the necessary permission to do so from the local police. Further, a member of the police would attend the gathering and ensure against any demonstration of lack of "loyalty, propriety and sobriety".

Tailors, hatters, shoemakers and other clothiers had to apply to quartermasters' at Gatchina for instruction on the styles they were allowed to make.

French fashion banned 
The scholar Lynn Hunt, discussing the fashions of France in the revolutionary period, describes the uniform of a "true Republican" as being "close-fitting pants of fine cloth, ankle boots, morning coats and round hats". Paul was averse to what he saw as "French degeneracy", argues Hughes. Everything he banned was suggestive, says Pares, of revolutionary France, whether in costume—round hats, frock coats, high collars—language—he prescribed public use of the word "society", "citizen" and "revolution"—or culture—neither European music nor literature was allowed, regardless of scientific or intellectual merit. Mention of the Enlightenment was also forbidden, as Paul believed it had led directly to the revolution. The press was heavily censored, although Paul's mother, Catherine, had also censored the press. Paul, though, was much more energetic in his efforts, and his decrees "closed down any pretensions of literary liberalism". Banned books included Catherine's own Instructions, a series of legal-philosophical musings based on writers such as Montesquieu, Cesare Beccaria and William Blackstone. Books from France were especially targeted as they were dated by the French revolutionary calendar. Booksellers were placed under police control.

Waistcoats were of particular importance to Paul. The Princess Liéven later stated that "the emperor claimed that waistcoats caused the entire French Revolution somehow". Also, clothing was restricted to solid colours only as was were private and public buildings, which had to all be repainted black and white. Further instruction applied to the decoration of their doors. It was ordered such as these, argues Duke, that created a "crazy atmosphere" in Saint Petersburg during Paul's reign.

The diarist and commentator Filipp Vigel was in Kiev when the Emperor's edict was announced and recognized the political overtones the seemingly garb-orientated instruction had. He described what he saw:

In 1797, Paul issued a ukase prohibiting certain items of clothing—round hats, top-boots, trousers and laced shoes—and making others—such as the tricorn, powdered queues, buckled shoes and breeches—mandatory. Meanwhile, the wearing of square-toed shoes and gaiters were enforced. Fops, says journalists "were forced to lock waistcoats and other ominous garments in their trunks until Paul's death". Not just the French style, but any that was new and fashionable was banned. This included trousers, frockcoats, round hats, top boots, laced shoes, low collars, tails waistcoats and boots. Scissors were taken to the tails of "revolutionary" frockcoats. This was a particular attack on the nobility, and, says Montefiori, "nothing was so odious" for them.

Paul dictated "the only lawfully permissible wear". His judicial assaults on French fashions, among other things, have been described by Vivyan as "tyrannical caprices". These clothes had been allowed during Catherine's reign. Turned-down coat collars were cut off and waistcoats were ripped off. The hats were confiscated and their wearers were interrogated at the nearest guardhouse. His campaign against hats and cravats was probably an expression of his desire for discipline and conformity in civilian dress, similar to that he had imposed upon the army. He also regulated citizens' deportment, the size of their coaches and the number of horses that drew them according to the status of their owners. He also concerned himself with the thickness of men's moustaches, hair to be combed back from the forehead, the depth of women's curtsies and the angle at which hats were worn. Toupées were banned, large curls in the hair and sideburns, as well as bright ribbons. Paul saw round hats and laced shoes as the apparel of the faubourg mobs and the sans-culottes. Polish historian Kazimierz Waliszewski notes that round hats and high cravats were banned along with colourful scarves. No excuses were accepted, and severe punishments awaited those who for did so.

To enforce his decrees, Paul recreated secret police, who among other duties, proactively searched the streets for men in round hats; those they found had them torn from their heads and then burnt (although they appear to have been acceptable if the wearer was in traditional dress). Those with wide lapels had them forcibly cut off in the street. By the end of 1796, it had become apparent, through constant police surveillance and the abundance of rules, that Paul himself was effectively the individual in the country who had legal liberties. He placed the police above the law, and they were zealous in their enforcement of Paul's edicts. His view of the police service, suggests Ragsdale, was that they guarded the citizenry against "malevolent influences", which would, therefore, enforce happiness upon the people.

The nobility—the dvorianstvo—was greatly influenced by French intellectual and cultural ideas, and Catherine generally encouraged this. However, on Paul's accession, this made them an immediate target of the new Emperor. Although he began by attacking their privileges, he eventually banned most liberal ideas. Waltzes were banned as licentious, except before him. Anyone dancing a waltz in his presence had to ensure that when they faced him their "every pose must imply the instinct of obeisance to the Emperor".

Literature and plays deemed to be influenced by French thinkers was suppressed. Homegrown literature was banned; for instance, although the Freemasons were a legitimate body—indeed, they flourished under Paul—their publications were proscribed. Thirteen words were banned in all, and in some cases Gallicisms were replaced with Prussianisms. In some cases, comments Cross, however, "the logic defies understanding", some words were removed but not replaced. This particular case, suggests Cross, indicates that Paul or his censors did not keep up with what they had banned, as this very word subsequently appeared in an Imperial decree of 1798.

Paul was partly motivated by the popularity of French fashions in her reign. Paul's was effectively a reaction against his mother, and the reforms he brought in were intentionally directed at the aristocracy, whom Catherine had encouraged to imitate that of France at Versailles. Fashion in directoire France was a reaction against the sombre, egalitarian clothes enjoined upon the populace by the Jacobin government. With the Thermidorian Reaction came a relaxation which saw a return to fancy clothes, especially colourful waistcoats and cravats so high they might cover the chin.

Traffic was to drive sedately, even the troikas. Balls and dances before the Imperial couple, commented Czartoryski, were events where "one risked losing his liberty", as numerous in-house spies were constantly reporting back to the Emperor or his wife anything that could be construed as a slight against them.

The cultural transition occurred almost overnight. The Polish diplomat Adam Jerzy Czartoryski relates how "never was there any change of scene at a theatre so sudden and so complete as the change of affairs at the accession of Paul. In less than a day, costumes, manners, occupations, all were altered". The biographer E. M. Almedingen comments that "less than a fortnight after the death of the Empress, a thick grey curtain fell upon the once gay 'Venice of the North'". The Russian diplomat Yury Golovkin described Saint Petersburg under Paul as a prison controlled from the Winter Palace where "before which one may not pass, even in the absence of the sovereign, without taking off one’s hat", and that one could not approach "without showing police passes seven times over". Foreigners, although officially exempt from this treatment, usually received it as well since the police did not ask questions as to whom they were stopping. For example, the British Ambassador in Saint Petersburg, Sir Charles Whitworth, had his nephew staying with him; the nephew was also manhandled in this way. Whitworth himself swiftly changed his headgear to avoid similar treatment.

Foreign policy 
Domestic affairs had primacy for most of the reign, and until 1797 was the sole focus of Paul's activity. Farquhar notes that Paul's "domestic tyranny coincided with a bizarre foreign policy". Early foreign policy showed signs of maturity, recalling expeditionary forces from Persia and releasing Polish prisoners. He reversed Catherine's policy towards the southern region, by neglecting the areas she had confiscated from the Ottoman Empire and legislated against runaway serfs to Novorossiya being treated as colonists rather than fugitives. For example, an arbitrary edict banning the trade of timber with Britain. Banned items were banned from both entering and leaving Russia. Paul's behaviour encouraged foreign observers to assume that Russia would sink back into an unenlightened state.

He felt he had been insulted at not being invited to participate at the Congress of Rastatt in 1797—which in William Doyle's words was "redrawing the map of Germany without consulting him"—and France's seizure of Malta confirmed his anti-French policy. French visitors were only allowed into the country on production of a passport issued under the Bourbons rather than the French revolutionary government, thus, says Spector, "proving he would not be a source of revolutionary propaganda". Paul welcomed French émigrés and granted Louis XVI a pension and estate.

There was also concern that his foreign policy was becoming erratic, and that his planned invasion of India was "dangerous and even foolish" for Russia to attempt. His son, on hearing of the plan, declared that Paul had "declared war on common sense". James Jenny, for example, suggests that it was not only Paul's rejection of Britain as an ally against Napoleon that made his nobility question his sanity but the speed with which he did so. Ragsdale argues that among Paul's contemporaries, opinion varied, and ranged from his being a fool to a hero. None of them, however, says Ragsdale, deny that by 1800 Paul was either "the dupe or the willing creature". However, Muriel Atkin argues that Paul's foreign policy was more pragmatic than his other policies or, for that matter, that of his son. The Russian scholar Boris Nolde argued that Paul was proactive in expanding Russian territories, yet was unable to base his policies on an analytical assessment of circumstances.

Last years 

The last year of the reign saw an increase in violent outbursts, and Paul seemed to have ceased taking his ministers' advice; Rogerson wrote, "everyone about him is at a loss what to do. Even Kutaisof is becoming very anxious". Paul's mental state seemed to have declined in the last few months of his life: illustrated, suggests Ragsdale, by events such as the intention of invading India and a declaration to European heads of state that, to finally resolve the Napoleonic Wars, they should engage in personal combat. Paul initiated this process early in 1801 by challenging the other rulers to individual duels. Paul declared that they should be "accompanied as equerries, arbiters, and heralds by their most enlightened ministers and most able generals, such as Messieurs Thugut, Pitt, [and] Bernstorff, himself proposing to be accompanied by Generals Pahlen and Kutuzov".

Around this time Paul complained of a "buzzing" in his ears. His family and favourites were not spared from his erraticism. Among the latter, Paul's barber—now a Count—suffered from his master's erratic behaviour, while Paul's son Constantine and his wife were only allowed to talk to each other in bed at night.

In 1800 Whitworth reported to London that Paul was "literally not in his senses". He told Grenville that while he had suspected it for some time, "since he has come to the throne, his disorder has gradually increased, and now manifests itself in such a manner as to fill everyone with the most obvious alarm". By now Paul was increasingly under the influence of his doctor, James Wylie, who according to his biographer Mary McGrigor, being "in constant close contact with Paul... came to realize the extent of the tsar’s mental instability".

To Kluchevsky, Paul's policies went from being political to pathological, increasingly governed by his mood swings rather than analytical consideration. Paranoid that the Winter Palace was too accessible for assassins—and indeed, that these enemies were already ensconced within the castle—in 1798 he ordered a new fortress built outside the city. Saint Michael's Castle was surrounded by drawbridges, moats and earthworks, and also contained numerous secret underground passages for escape. This was completed in 1801, and that February Paul moved his family in. By this time, Paul's behaviour had become even more unbalanced, and Paul's doctor, John Rogerson, expressed his concern about the Emperor's health, writing "the cloud is darkening, the incoherence of his movements increases and becomes more manifest from day to day". Paul's wife, Maria Feodorovna, commented that "there is no one who does not daily remark on the disorder of his faculties". His unpredictable behaviour and policies were a direct reason for the conspiracy that was to overthrow him in favour of his son, and it may have been Paul's foreign policy that eventually convinced his son Alexander to authorize the deposition.

Assassination 
Paul had offended too many important vested interests, argues Esdaile, and so with Alexander's permission, members of Paul's nobility plotted to remove him. The deposition took place on the evening of 23 March 1801; during a struggle, Paul was killed. His death was later to be announced to have been due to apoplexy, which Grey suggests was plausible on account of the "insensate rages" he was known for.

The aristocracy did not often speak or act as a single homogenous bloc, and this prevented them from offering a united resistance. His assassination, suggests Dixon, indicates that there was an unstated boundary over which a Tsar should not step except with the consent of his nobility. Lieven identifies Paul's claim, that no one was noble in Russia except he to whom Paul was speaking, as being directly contributory to his downfall. He argues that their motivation was both Paul's foreign policy and their fear of his attacks upon their class.

Accession of Alexander I 
Following Paul's assassination and the accession of his son as Alexander I, Paul's mandates were repealed. There were, comments Waliszewski, "no tears" at Paul's funeral and people "genuinely exulted" at the opportunity to wear round hats, cravats and cutaway coats. In her memoirs, Countess Golovina described the reactions she saw, and how an officer of hussars charged his horse up and down the Quay, shouting "'Now we can do anything we like!' This was his idea of liberty!"

There was much spontaneous rejoicing, comment MacKenzie and Curran, from the nobility and bourgeoisie. Paul appears to have been well-loved by the common people though, and Ragsdale points out that "allegedly more votary candles burned on the grave of Paul than any other Tsar". An Austrian diplomat in St Petersburg at the time commented that "the general joy at the change of regime, most marked in the capital cities and among the military and service nobility, was[...] the normal reaction to the death of every Russian ruler".

Russian media almost immediately began promoting French, English, German and other European fashions of the day, and fashions changed weekly. Alexander released thousands of those imprisoned or suffering Siberian exile due to Paul; he also reopened printing presses, restored foreign travel and cultural interaction, and reduced censorship.

Later events 
The words "waistcoat", "tailcoat" and "pantaloons" did not re-enter the Dictionary of the Russian Academy for decades. In his 1833 verse-novel, the poet Alexander Pushkin mentions the foreignness of certain words even then: "" ("But pants, tailcoat, vest/There are no such words in Russian").  "

Empress Alexandra Feodorovna, the wife of Nicholas II, told the latter—who was facing discontent in the State Duma in 1916—that in dealing with his enemies he should be more like "Peter the Great, John the Terrible, Emperor Paul—crush them under you".

Personality 
Signs of paranoia emerged even when he was a young man, particularly towards his mother on account of his suspicions. The biographer Henri Troyat tells of one occasion when, having found some small pieces of glass in his food, the young Paul ran screaming to Catherine's apartment and accused her to her face of trying to kill him. The French correspondent Bérenger reported that Paul publicly—and repeatedly—questioned his father's death, and gave “evidence of sinister and dangerous inclinations".

Paul's "odd obsessions", suggests Stone, led directly to Russia's involvement in the wars against revolutionary France, which had been initiated by Catherine but which he had ended.  McGrew argues that, although an absolutist, Paul's personality flaws made him take absolutism "to its logical, and therefore politically irrational, end".

His early life and upbringing moulded his later reign: the mental strain of being aware of his uncertain patrilineacy, poor nursing and his father's murder all combined, suggest MacKenzie and Curran, made him "quick-tempered, impulsive, inconsistent, and generally high-strung". A "nervous and suspicious eccentric. He was a stubborn, quick-tempered, unpredictable, absolutist, embittered man." "Fear and suspicion", says Mazour, "made him erratic, totally unreasonable and unpredictable"; which Ragsdale ascribes to Paul's upbringing as making him feel "exceptionally important and exceptionally insecure".

Opinions and historiography

Contemporary opinion 

Ragsdale notes that while Paul is generally agreed to have been—"with varying degrees of explicitness"—mentally abnormal, there is "an undercurrent of suspicion" that this has been artificially influenced by the views of a small number of erudite contemporaries and the memoirs they have left. As a result, Ragsdale recommends that historiographers avoid them. Ragsdale suggests that there are better contemporary sources than memoirs, suggesting the writings of Paul's intimates, such as his tutors, records of his public appearances and foreign diplomatic reports. McGrew suggests that diplomatic reports and briefings are invaluable sources. There are, though, he suggests, sufficient complaints in contemporary sources to conclude that people hated what the Emperor was doing. He, in the knowledge that his policies were for the best, ignored them. 

Alexander himself wrote that

His wife, Elizabeth Alexeievna also disliked Paul, describing him to her mother as—in their native German— (disgusting), and that "said so himself. And his wish is generally fulfilled, he is feared and hated." Paul's Grand Marshal, Fyodor Rostopchin, however, blamed Paul's advisors rather than the Emperor himself, later writing that he was "surrounded by such people that the most honest would deserve to be hanged without trial". Rospotchin continued that Paul was "destroying himself and contriving the means of making himself hated". Paul's mental condition may have allowed his assassins to have persuaded themselves that they were acting in the interests of Russia rather themselves, suggests Kenney, if they saw the country's interests "threatened by an insane Tsar".

Historiography
A petty tyrant, with regular outbursts of intense rage, with the "salient feature" of his policy being to reverse his mother's policy where he could. Atkin sums up Paul's problem in that he "had an unhappy talent for making even his wisest moves appear ill-considered". Ragsdale suggests that Paul's problem with the army was that he overly focussed on superficial details rather than broad reorganisations, which contemporaries called the "Gatchina spirit": "parades and manoeuvres, uniforms and equipment, awards and punishments, in short with the minutiae of army life, and a corresponding neglect of weightier matters likely to prove decisive in war: morale, professional training [and] technical progress". Paul's changes were nether revolutionary nor swiftly imposed, argues Waliszewski, but his policies have been summarized as "instability and capriciousness". While Wortman suggests that his reign was an "embarrassment" for his successors.

Ragsdale also argues that it is not impossible that certain of his intimates, such as Count Pahlen, manipulated Paul and the events surrounding him to create the impression of bizarre behaviour as a way of subtly paving the way for the eventual coup, although he notes that there is little that can be done about that. McGrew argues that "even if Paul was not the monster his detractors claimed he was, it is doubtful he deserves the approving tone which marks some recent writing", as even some of those who sympathized with him at the time criticized him.  Historian David R. Stone argues that Paul's edicts over round hats and cravats, for example, were "small matter that symbolized a larger shortcoming". It is also likely that Paul believed that his policies, while hated by those they were directed at, were, improving people's happiness. If nothing else, says Ragsdale, "there is no denying that the man was bizarre and that his conduct was radically imprudent".

The historian John W. Strong says that Paul I has traditionally had "the dubious distinction of being known as the worst Tsar in the history of the Romanov dynasty", as well as there is a question about his sanity, although Strong concludes that such "generalizations [...] are no longer satisfactory". Anatole G. Mazour called Paul "one of the most colourful personalities" of his dynasty. Russian historians have traditionally been dismissive of Paul on account of his eccentricities. I. A. Fedosov called him a "crazy despot [who] threatened to discredit the very idea of absolutism". Dixon argues that Paul was no more absolutist than Catherine had been; for her too, "consensus had to be achieved on her terms". Paul's reign was an object lesson, suggest Ryeff, and regardless of his good intentions, in the need for security and calm, rather than his brand of arbitrary government. MacKenzie and Curran summarize the significance of Paul's campaign against his mother's legacy as demonstrating the dangers of autocracy in irresponsible hands, and the nobility realized that "autocratic power could destroy privileges as well as grant them". A "frivolous petty tyrant", suggest McGrew, while Duke argues that Paul's "anecdotal" brutality has caricatured him. Grey has argued that while his domestic policy may have been rational in intention, it was anything but in its execution. Professor Bernard Pares has called Paul "essentially a tyrant". Historian Lindsey Hughes says that Paul's reign contrasted sharply with his "laid back" predecessor.

McGrew, like Rostochpin at the time, argues that Paul was let down by his subordinates, who were "either venal or incompetent". He also blames personal qualities, however, describing his rages as tantrums that made him appear a "small-minded martinet who might order but could never lead".

For Dixon, Paul's reign exemplifies the importance of the individual in history, in how easy it was for Paul to dismantle so much of Catherine's work in such a short space of time. Conversely, for Marc Raeff, Paul's reign demonstrates the danger of failing to institutionalize the bureaucracy, as there was an inherent risk of it being at the mercy of a highly personalized style of governance such as his. Paul's reign, argue MacKenzie and Curran, is both "controversial and disputed"; Cobenzl noted that, while the Emperor had the ability and good intentions, his mercurial personality combined with inexperience made his approach ineffective. Historian Walther Kirchner has described Paul's reforms as "arbitrary and useless", while Rey notes their internal inconsistency. 

Other examples of Paul's eccentricities that survive have been accepted by historians as having a kernel of truth. For example, notes Duke, that of Lieutenant Kijé, a fictional creation on a military recruitment list—the result of a clerk's misspelling—who Paul supposedly promoted, made a general, died and was demoted all without the Emperor ever seeing him; at the same time a living man was written out of existence  On being told of the non-existent Kijé's untimely death, Paul is supposed to have replied: "that it is a great pity, as he was such a good officer". This "factual life of [a] fictitious lieutenant" was first described by the lexicographer Vladimir Dal, who said he received it from his father.

Positivity of Paul's reign 
The revisionist process began with M. V. Kloökov’s 1913 history of Paul's reign, in which he argued that contemporary memoirs and accounts were either biased or otherwise unreliable, emphasizing that in Paul's administrative work he should be seen as an enlightened absolutist. Muriel Atkin has argued that "if no one has yet claimed that Paul was an exceptionally wise and able man, some historians, at least, have shown that he was neither as foolish nor as mad as the partisans of Catherine and Alexander would have him believe."

Catherine's reign had seen government spending rise dramatically, and government debt with it, with concomitant hyperinflation and decline in tax revenues. Her court may have been brilliant on the surface, argues McGrew, but

 Kluchevsky believes that Paul had reforming instincts, as shown by his edicts against serfdom for example, but his ability to follow them stemmed from character traits generally and his antipathy towards Catherine specifically. McGrew has also emphasized Paul's reforming inclinations, although, notes Esdaile, his thesis has not been universally accepted. However, he believes "McGrew's conclusions do not seem unreasonable", and he could be the soul of tolerance, towards, for example, the Jews who did not suffer under his reign as they had done in previous. In spite of the shortness of his reign, he was responsible for important, and often progressive, innovations in administration. The historian Paul Dukes notes that there has been a degree of rehabilitation of Paul's reign in the late 20th century, particularly among Soviet historians. However, he suggests, Paul's policy "came less of the fact that he realized the existing order to be inequitable and inadequate than of the fact that he still bore antipathy to his mother, and still cherished wrath against her assistants". Even, argues Kluchevsky, desisting from progressive policies if they seemed overly similar to his mother's.

He also made the crown a major employer: the administration of his decrees required a drastic increase in personnel, and Paul paid well. McGrew notes that, while both Catherine and Paul were lavish with personal gifts to those that supported them, the latter spread his munificence more broadly, and "pour[ed] literally millions of roubles in salaries, pensions and land grants" to hundreds of government employees. Whitworth commented that Paul's liberalism with money tempered popular dislike of his social policies, and the fact that he was able to continue with these policies while keeping the citizenry onside augured well for his future reign.

Esdaile notes that much of what Paul attacked—laxity in tax collecting, slackness in the civil service for example—needed something urgently done, and Paul did. This was as well as simplifying some areas of local government and establishing schools of medicine. If the problem was one of discipline and efficiency, says Esdaile, "here is no doubt that brusque as Paul’s approach was", about the administration he made positive achievements, although he notes that these successes were intertwined with "a measure of the absurd". McGrew suggests, for example, that Paul's proscription on the speed of the city's troikas can only have been a positive thing for St Petersburg's pedestrians. He was also right to attempt to re-instil discipline into the Russian Army, which had slipped in the latter years of his mother's reign. His centralizing of the army's War College was also a progressive policy, suggests Keep.

Although keep argues was Paul's methods which he should be criticized for, rather than the intention, as the army had grown slack in the final years of Catherine's reign, with more officers than was required, and many of them drawing salaries without attending to their duty. Likewise, Charles Esdaile also emphasizes that, while Paul's treatment of the army's officers verged on brutal, he was regarded with approval by the common soldier for his willingness to treat their officers without fear of favour, thus making the army a safer place for the ordinary trooper. This suggests, says Esdaile, that Paul had "genuine care" for their lot. Paul, suggests Blum, although far less well known or liked than his mother, actually went further than she did in improving serf rights. Similarly, Paul was not unpopular in the countryside, as landowners respected an Emperor who cracked down on corrupt local officialdom.

McGrew emphasizes that "much of what Paul intended and did[...] had its praiseworthy side". He restored the Governing Senate, which had fallen into disuse and was plagued by absenteeism, to a functioning court of appeal, and was sufficiently successful that it adjudicated 12,000 cases in the first year of his reign.

The incidents of Paul's reign have to some extent created a mythology around his rule, argues Kohn Keep, noting that, for example, the tale of Paul promoting a sergeant purely so that the latter could guard his sledge is apocryphal as Paul's keenness on observing the niceties of military rank would not have allowed him to take such a course of action. Exaggerations such as these, Keep suggests, "illustrate the wealth of myth that for too long has impeded serious historical research" into the reign. Along with the reigns of his mother and eldest son, Paul has been described by Simon M. Dixon as "the sole key to an understanding of modern Russian history".

These "despotic caprices", says scholar George Vernadsky have overcast and distracted from the original ideas he approached his reign with at the beginning. His administration made the first serious effort to limit serfdom in Russia, forbidding serfs to work more than three days on the same estate; although in some places—such as Ukraine, where they only had to work two—this created more confusion than it solved, and could have led to their workload being increased. He may have been mentally unstable by this time, suggests Vernadsky; and Grey notes that, while he seems to have intended their overall lot to be improved, "with typical inconsistency he also introduced several measures which added to their burdens, for example making it easier for merchants to purchase serfs for industry. He also made it mandatory for every village to install a grain bin to store supplies against a harsh winter for the serfs. Indeed, notes Spector, he was the first Tsar "for many generations" to legislate in favour of serfs, regardless of his intention in doing so, and became a blueprint for his successors: following Paul's reign, argues Spector, "whereas all rulers before Paul aided in intensifying the bondage of the serfs, each one thereafter made serious efforts" to help them. To this end, he forbade serfs to work the nobility's estates on Sundays, while also imposing a new tax on those estates. His edit against serfdom was frequently disobeyed, but, says Blum they "proved to be the turning point" in the relations between serfs and their lords. Although MacKenzie and Curran argue that this was less out of a desire for social reform and more a reaction against the privileges his mother had granted their owners.

Mental illness debate 

People publicly speculated on Paul's mental health from the moment he died, noted Esdaile, and "many opinions can be found to the effect that he was, if not actually insane, then at the very least seriously disturbed", and, while he agreed that from "this distance, it is, of course, impossible to offer a diagnosis of Paul’s problems with any certainty", he inclined toward a severe form of obsessive-compulsive disorder. Insanity has a specific legal and medical meaning, noted Ragsdale, particularly in a criminal court. Before such conditions were understood, it was suggested that epilepsy could have been the cause of any instability. Thomas Riha argues that while Paul may have been insane, "there was a method in his madness", in that he reaffirmed the autocracy of the Imperial crown which was continued and strengthened by his successors.

Professor Baron Michel Alexsandrovitch de Taube called him an enigmatic ruler capable of the bizarre (referring to his claim to the Grand mastership of the Knights of Malta in 1798). A reign characterized by "some remarkable spastic impulses". Kuckov disputes that Paul was insane, arguing that Paul offended so many interest groups that it was an easy accusation to make. Esdaile agrees that Paul may have had obsessive-compulsive disorder,  although Stone points out that "diagnosing mental disorders in historical figures is a dangerous enterprise". It was also to the advantage of Russian monarchists throughout the remainder of the century to emphasize Paul's mental instability as a means of justifying Alexander's accession, and thence the dynasty as a whole. But it would account for aspects of his personality that can be identified today, such as his rigidity, inhibitions, and over-conscientiousness combined with an inability to relax. MacKenzie and Curran agree he was probably psychotic. Russian scholar Ivar Spector suggests that, as a result of his upbringing, Paul was "so physically and mentally broken that many of his contemporaries, as well as later historians, believed him to have been insane".

Duke argues that Paul had psychological issues, and notes that this "made him mad according to some analysts". As a result, says Duke, "there has been some interesting work on his mental make up", for example, V. H. Chizh's 1907 study, as a result of which Chizh concluded that Paul was not sick mentally. McGrew argues he was politically incompetent and tyrannous rather than insane. Atkin suggests that Paul's invasion of India, which has been used as an example of his poor judgement, should be seen as nothing of the sort: "the issue of his mental state, however, will have to be decided based on other evidence. The assumption that his Indian ambitions were mad tells us far more about the double standard" that has been applied.

Although at least one contemporary, Baron Andrei Lvovich Nicolai, considered that it was not Paul who was mentally ill, "but his government intolerable". Ragsdale has argued that Paul's behaviour is suggestive of several mental conditions understood to the 21st century—paranoia, obsessive-compulsive disorder, hysterical neurosis, and paranoid schizophrenia, for example—but none definitively so. He also notes that according to the lights of the time, had he been truly insane, he would have been treated in the same relatively humane manner that his distant cousins and fellow sovereigns in Europe were treated, such as George III of Great Britain, Maria I of Portugal and Christian VII of Denmark. The scholar Ole Feldbæk remarks that, ultimately, "In works on Paul I the authors have—sometimes implicitly, but mostly explicitly—
expressed their opinion as to whether Paul was mentally unstable or not, and whether his actions were irrational or rational. Paul, I may have been mentally unstable, and he may not. And he may have been exhibiting signs of mental instability during the last period of his reign only."

Notes

References

Bibliography 

 
 
 
 
 
 
 
 
 
 
 
 
 
 
 
 
 
 
 
 
 
 
 
 
 
 
 
 
 
 
 
 
 
 
 
 
 
 
 
 
 
 
 
 
 
 
 
 
 
 
 
 
 
 
 
 
 
 
 
 
 
 
 
 
 
 
 
 
 
 
 
 
 
 
 
 
 
 
 
 
 
 
 
 
 
 
 
 
 
 
 
 
 
 

Paul I
Paul I of Russia
Historiography of Russia
Russian history articles needing expert attention